Ibrahim Bey (born Abram Shinjikashvili; 1735 – 1816/1817) was a Mamluk chieftain and regent of Egypt.

Biography
Ibrahim Bey was born as Abram Shinjikashvili (აბრამ შინჯიკაშვილი), of Georgian origin, into the family of a Christian priest in Martqopi in the southeastern Georgian province of Kakheti. As a child, he was captured by Ottoman slave raiders and sold out in Egypt where he was converted to Islam and trained as a Mamluk. Through loyal service to Muhammad Bey Abu al-Dhahab, the Mamluk ruler of Egypt, he rose in rank and attained to the dignity of bey.

With time he emerged as one of the most influential Mamluk commanders, sharing a de facto control of Egypt with his fellow Murad Bey. The two men became a duumvirate, Murad Bey managing military matters while Ibrahim Bey managed civil administration. They survived through the persistent Ottoman attempts at overthrowing the Mamluk regime and civil strifes. They served as kaymakams (acting governors) in Egypt on occasion, although they effectively held de facto power for decades, even over the appointed Ottoman governor of Egypt. From 1771 to 1773, Ibrahim Bey served as the amir al-hajj (commander of the hajj caravan) of Egypt.

In 1786, the Ottoman sultan Abdülhamid I sent Kapudan Pasha (grand admiral of the Ottoman Navy) Cezayirli Gazi Hasan Pasha to drive out Ibrahim and Murad Bey. Hasan Pasha was fervent and thorough in his efforts and succeeded in the short term, reestablishing direct Ottoman Empire control over Egypt. Ismail Bey was appointed as new Mamluk leader and Shaykh al-Balad (civil governor and de facto ruler). However, in 1792, only six years after their expulsion by Hasan Pasha, the duumvirate returned to Cairo from hiding in southern Egypt and took back de facto control.

When the French invaded Egypt in 1798, Ibrahim fought against Napoleon's armies at the battles of the Pyramids and the Heliopolis but was defeated on both occasions. These defeats effectively ended his reign over the country, and he died in obscurity in 1816 or 1817, having survived Mohammad Ali Pasha's 1811 massacre of Mameluke leaders.

See also
 Murad Bey, Ibrahim's career-long partner in ruling Egypt
 Saqaliba

References

1735 births
1817 deaths
18th-century Ottoman governors of Egypt
19th-century Ottoman governors of Egypt
Egyptian nobility
Political people from the Ottoman Empire
Mamluks
Georgians from the Ottoman Empire
Former Georgian Orthodox Christians
Converts to Islam from Eastern Orthodoxy
Muslims from Georgia (country)
Ottoman governors of Egypt
People from the Ottoman Empire of Georgian descent
People from Kvemo Kartli